Pawan Kalyan (born Konidela Kalyan Babu; 2 September 1968 or 1971) is an Indian actor, filmmaker, and politician. His films are predominantly in Telugu cinema. Kalyan is the younger brother of actor-ex.politician Chiranjeevi, and made his debut in the 1996 film Akkada Ammayi Ikkada Abbayi. He starred in Tholi Prema in 1998, which won the National Film Award for Best Feature Film in Telugu that year.

Referred to as "Power Star" by his fans, Kalyan is known for films such as Gokulamlo Seeta, Suswagatham, Tholi Prema, Thammudu, Badri, Kushi, Jalsa, Gabbar Singh, Gopala Gopala and Attarintiki Daredi. He received the Filmfare Award for Best Actor – Telugu for Gabbar Singh while Attarintiki Daredi held the record of being the highest-grossing Telugu film. He was listed 26th in 2013, 69th in 2017, and 24th in 2018 respectively in the Forbes India list of top 100 Celebrities. He produces films under the banners Anjana Productions and Pawan Kalyan Creative Works.

In 2008, Kalyan entered into politics as the president of youth wing of Praja Rajyam Party, founded by his brother Chiranjeevi. He left the party after Chiranjeevi merged it into the Congress party. In March 2014, Kalyan founded the Jana Sena Party. During that period, he was listed by Google as the most searched Indian celebrity politician on Google Search. He is widely known for his philanthropic work. He founded a charitable trust called Common Man Protection Force (CMPF), which was known to assist citizens who fall under EWS in the states of Telangana and Andhra Pradesh. He holds a black belt in karate and specializes in various martial arts which he depicts in his films regularly.

Early life and family 
Kalyan was born on 2 September in 1968 or 1971 to Konidela Venkata Rao and Anjana Devi in Bapatla, Andhra Pradesh. He is the younger brother of Chiranjeevi and Nagendra Babu. He was awarded "Pawan" during one of his public martial arts presentations. He holds a black belt in karate. He is also the uncle of actors Ram Charan, Varun Tej, Sai Dharam Tej and Allu Arjun.

Acting career 

Kalyan made his acting debut in 1996 with Akkada Ammayi Ikkada Abbayi. His second film Gokulamlo Seeta released the following year. He next appeared in A. Karunakaran-directed Tholi Prema (1999) which won the National Award and six Nandi Awards that year. After Tholi Prema, Kalyan acted in Thammudu, playing the role of a kick boxer. Thammudu was released on 15 July 1999 and was written and directed by P. A. Arun Prasad. On 20 April 2000, he acted in Puri Jagannadh's first directorial venture, Badri. Produced by T. Trivikrama Rao and music composed by Ramana Gogula.

In 2001, he acted in the film Kushi. The film was released on 27 April 2001 and was directed by S. J. Suryah, which became a huge blockbuster that year. In 2001, he was the brand ambassador for Pepsi at the time his brother Chiranjeevi was promoting Coca-Cola. His next film Johnny, written and directed by himself, released on 26 April 2003. Kalyan also starred in the film, along with Renu Desai, produced by Allu Aravind, and music composed by Ramana Gogula. Also in the same year they made Kushi (the remake) which was in 3 languages Hindi, Tamil and Telugu

In 2004, his film Gudumba Shankar was released. The film was directed by Veera Shankar and produced by Kalyan's brother Nagendra Babu under Anjana Productions banner. The film's script and screenplay were written by Kalyan and he also choreographed three songs in this film and action scenes were conceived and choreographed by him. In 2005, the film Balu, directed by A. Karunakaran was released. This was Karunakaran's second film with Kalyan after Tholi Prema. This film was produced by C. Ashwini Dutt under Vyjayanthi Movies banner.

In 2006, Bangaram, directed by Tamil director Dharani was released. During March 2006, Kalyan launched his second directorial venture Satyagrahi, produced by A. M. Rathnam, which would be a tale questioning the atrocities in society. After spending a few months on pre-production by signing with P. C. Sreeram and A. R. Rahman, the film was later suddenly shelved. Later that year, he appeared in Annavaram, directed by Bhimaneni Srinivasa Rao. Asin, and Sandhya were cast alongside Kalyan in the film and the film was produced under Super Good Films. The film was a remake of the Tamil film Thirupaachi. Kalyan also choreographed the song "Neevalle Neevalle" in this film.

In 2008, Jalsa, directed by Trivikram Srinivas and produced by Allu Aravind was released on 2 April. This film got the highest first-day collection in Telugu film history and was also the first for any regional film in south India in a single state by that time. Jalsa turned out to be the highest grosser of 2008 in Telugu cinema. Puli was written and directed by S. J. Suryah and released in 2010. An official announcement was made in the same year that Kalyan was going to play a small role in a movie about Jesus Christ directed by Singeetam Srinivasa Rao. In 2011, he appeared in Teen Maar, a remake of  Love Aaj Kal, directed by Jayanth C. Paranjee. He also appeared in Vishnuvardhan's gangster film Panjaa.

In 2012, he appeared in Gabbar Singh, a remake of Dabangg, directed by Harish Shankar. The film successfully completed 100 days and stood as the second highest-grossing Telugu film at that time. After this film, he worked in Puri Jagannadh's Cameraman Gangatho Rambabu.

In 2013, he appeared in Trivikram Srinivas's Attarintiki Daredi. The film, released on 27 September 2013, faced problems with piracy as half of the movie was leaked to the internet prior to its release. In spite of this the movie was a blockbuster in 2013. The movie completed 100 days in 33 theaters and held the record of the highest-grossing film in Tollywood by that time, surpassing the previous record of Magadheera. Later, it was surpassed by Baahubali: The Beginning.

In 2014, a Star India survey ranked Kalyan as one of the Top 5 Heroes of India. In 2015, he appeared in Gopala Gopala, a Telugu remake of OMG – Oh My God!. The film featured Kalyan starring alongside Venkatesh and was directed by Kishore Kumar Pardasani. In 2016, Kalyan's Sardaar Gabbar Singh, a sequel to his 2012 film Gabbar Singh received poor reviews from critics. Katamarayudu (2017), a remake of Tamil film Veeram marked his second collaboration with Kishore Kumar Pardasani. In 2018, he appeared in the film Agnyaathavaasi directed by Trivikram Srinivas. This marked Kalyan's 25th film.

In 2021, he made a comeback to films by appearing in Vakeel Saab, directed by Venu Sriram. He has also started shooting for Hari Hara Veera Mallu with director Krish scheduled to be released in 2022. Mythri Movie Makers also announced a film with Kalyan under the direction of Harish Shankar.

Political career

Praja Rajyam Party 
Kalyan started his political career in 2008 as the president of Yuvarajyam, the youth wing of Praja Rajyam Party which was started by his elder brother Chiranjeevi. He neither contested in elections nor did he hold any constitutional post during his days in Praja Rajyam Party. While he actively campaigned for the party, he was also hit with few health problems. Kalyan was struck with bouts of vomiting, as he was hit by a sunstroke during a roadshow at Vizag on 19 April 2009. Later, in 2011, when Chiranjeevi merged his party with Congress, Kalyan took a break from political life, expressing his silent discontent with his brother's decision to merge the party, and started a new political party in 2014 called Jana Sena Party.

Jana Sena Party 
Kalyan founded a political party named Jana Sena Party on 14 March 2014. He wrote a book titled Ism which is also the ideology of the Jana Sena party. He met with then BJP Prime ministerial candidate Narendra Modi to discuss the issues related to both the Telugu states and extended his support. He campaigned extensively for the Telugu Desam Party (TDP) and BJP alliance in Andhra Pradesh and Telangana. He opposed Congress party's rule stating the slogan Congress Hatao, Desh Bachao ( in Hindi). His rallies drew what the Deccan-Journal called "huge crowds" in Andhra Pradesh and Telangana. In August 2017, he announced that he intended to enter full-time politics starting October 2017 once he completes his film commitments.

He provoked the Uddanam kidney disease crisis by various protests and a hunger strike, which was later controlled by the Government of Andhra Pradesh by constructing dialysis centers and implementing various schemes for the village. In November 2016, Kalyan announced that Jana Sena will contest in the 2019 general elections in Andhra Pradesh. He stated that he was planning to contest from all 175 legislatures of Andhra Pradesh without any alliance. He opposed central government's move to privatise Dredging Corporation of India (DCI) on a golden platter. Kalyan led a protest march to condolence farmers who committed suicides or migrated from the drought-prone regions of Rayalaseema. He opposed the TDP Government's decision on land pooling. Kalyan conducted a march on the historical Dowleswaram Barrage in Rajahmundry demanding political accountability. He exposed the alleged unchecked mining in the reserve forest area at Vanthada village of Prathipadu in East Godavari district.

Kalyan has announced the Jana Sena party's 2019 election manifesto at Rajahmundry public meeting with many measures to improve the lives of farmers, farm labourers, women, youth, and students. His party would contest together with left parties Communist Party of India, Communist Party of India (Marxist), and Bahujan Samaj Party for the upcoming 2019 elections in both Telugu states of Andhra Pradesh and Telangana.

The Jana Sena Party has contested 140 constituencies in the 2019 Andhra Pradesh Legislative Assembly elections. Kalyan has contested two constituencies – Gajuwaka and Bhimavaram. He has lost in both to candidates from YSR Congress Party. His party was able to win from Razole, making it the only seat it has won in the election.

Later the same year, on 3 November 2019, Kalyan led a long march in Visakhapatnam in support of construction workers against YSR Congress Party governance who have been facing unemployment due to shortage of supply of sand in Andhra Pradesh.

On 16 January 2020, Kalyan has announced his party's alliance with BJP, after three years of distancing from it. Both the parties would fight together in the upcoming elections in 2024. On 12 February 2020, he led a rally for justice to Sugali Preethi, a 15-year-old girl who was brutally raped and murdered, in Kurnool. He demanded an inquiry by Central Bureau of Investigation (CBI) into the incident.

Other works

Brand endorsements 
 In April 2001, soft-drink giant Pepsi, announced him as its brand ambassador, making him the first South Indian to endorse the popular soft-drink.
 In January 2017, Kalyan agreed to take up the role of the brand ambassador for hand loom weavers in Andhra Pradesh and Telangana.
 In August 2017, Kalyan was asked to be the brand ambassador to JEEVAN DAAN, an initiative started for organ donation by government of Andhra Pradesh.

Harvard University 
Kalyan was invited to Harvard University to deliver a speech in 14th edition of India Conference 2017 along with Madhavan.

Personal life 
Kalyan married Nandini in 1997, one year after his film debut. In 2001, Kalyan started to be in a live-in relationship with his co-star Renu Desai and their son Akira Nandan was born in 2004. In June 2007, Nandini filed a bigamy case on Kalyan alleging that he remarried without divorcing her. Kalyan responded by stating that he had not married Desai and a magistrate court in Visakhapatnam cleared him of the charge due to lack of evidence. Subsequently, in July 2007, Kalyan filed for divorce at a family court in Visakhapatnam claiming that Nandini deserted him immediately after their marriage, which was denied by her lawyer. In August 2008, their divorce was formalized with an alimony of 5 crore paid by Kalyan as a one-time settlement.

In 2009, Kalyan married Desai after eight years of live-in companionship. Their daughter Aadya was born in 2010. The couple parted ways in 2012 with a formal divorce. In an interview in 2018, Desai claimed that Kalyan "insisted on a divorce in spite of her initial protests." She added that Kalyan denied her request of making a public statement about their divorce.

Kalyan met his third wife, Anna Lezhneva, a Russian citizen during the shoot of Teen Maar (2011). They married in September 2013 under Special Marriage Act at a Sub-Registrar Office in Hyderabad. The couple has a daughter Polena Anjana Pawanova and a son Mark Shankar Pawanovich.

Awards and nominations

Notes

References

External links 

 
 

Year of birth missing (living people)
Living people
20th-century Indian male actors
21st-century Indian male actors
Age controversies
Andhra Pradesh politicians
Artists from Andhra Pradesh
Film directors from Andhra Pradesh
Film musicians from Andhra Pradesh
Indian actor-politicians
Indian film choreographers
Indian political party founders
Indian stunt performers
Jana Sena Party politicians
Male actors from Andhra Pradesh
Male actors in Telugu cinema
People from Guntur district
Screenwriters from Andhra Pradesh
Telangana politicians
Telugu male actors
Telugu playback singers
Telugu screenwriters